Karl Friedrich August Gützlaff (8 July 1803 – 9 August 1851), anglicised as Charles Gutzlaff, was a German Lutheran missionary to the Far East, notable as one of the first Protestant missionaries in Bangkok, Thailand (1828) and in Korea (1832). He was also the first Lutheran missionary to China. He was a magistrate in Ningpo and Chusan and the second Chinese Secretary of the British administration in Hong Kong.

He wrote widely read books and served as interpreter for British diplomatic missions during the First Opium War. Gützlaff was one of the first Protestant missionaries in China to wear Chinese clothing.

He was elected as a member to the American Philosophical Society in 1839.

Early life 
Born at Pyritz (present-day Pyrzyce), Pomerania, he was apprenticed to a saddler in Stettin, but was able to secure admission to Pädagogium in Halle, and associated himself with the Janike Institute in Berlin.

The Netherlands Missionary Society sent him to Java in 1826, where he learned Chinese. Gutzlaff left the society in 1828, and went first to Singapore, then to Bangkok with Jacob Tomlin of the London Missionary Society, where he worked on a translation of the Bible into Thai. He made a brief trip to Singapore in December 1829, where he married a single English missionary, Maria Newell.  The two returned to Bangkok in February 1830 where they worked on a dictionary of Cambodian and Lao. Before the work was completed, however, Maria died in childbirth, leaving a considerable inheritance.  Gützlaff married again, this time to Mary Wanstall, in 1834. The second Mrs. Gützlaff ran a school and a home for the blind in Macau.

China

In Macau, and later in Hong Kong, Gützlaff worked on a Chinese translation of the Bible, published a Chinese-language magazine, Eastern Western Monthly Magazine, and wrote Chinese-language books on practical subjects. Along with East India Company staff Hugh Hamilton Lindsay, Gutzlaff joined a clandestine reconnaissance that visited Amoy, Foochow, Ningbo, Shanghai and the Shantung coast.   He published Journal of Three Voyages along the Coast of China in 1831, 1832 and 1833 in 1834 after the six-month voyage.  Along the way he handed out tracts which had been prepared by another pioneer missionary to China, Robert Morrison.  In late 1833, he acted as naturalist George Bennett's Cantonese interpreter on his visit to Canton.

In 1840, Gützlaff (under the anglicized name Charles Gutzlaff) became part of a group of four people (with Walter Henry Medhurst, Elijah Coleman Bridgman, and John Robert Morrison) who cooperated to translate the Bible into Chinese. The translation of the Hebrew part was done mostly by Gützlaff, with the exception that the Pentateuch and the Book of Joshua were done by the group collectively. This translation, completed in 1847, is well-known due to its adoption by the revolutionary peasant leader Hong Xiuquan of the Taipingtianguo movement (who started the Taiping Rebellion) as some of the reputed early doctrines of the organization. This Bible translation was a version (in High Wen-li) correct and faithful to the original.

In the 1830s, Gützlaff was persuaded by William Jardine of Jardine, Matheson & Co. to interpret for their ships' captains during coastal smuggling of opium, with the assurance that this would allow him to gather more converts. He was interpreter to the British Plenipotentiary in negotiations during the First Opium War of 1839–42, then magistrate at Ningpo and Chusan.  He was appointed the first assistant Chinese Secretary of the new colony of Hong Kong in 1842 and was promoted to Chinese Secretary in August of the following year.  In response to the Chinese government's unwillingness to allow foreigners into the interior, he founded a school for "native missionaries" in 1844 and trained nearly fifty Chinese during its first four years.

It was observed by a visitor to Hong Kong in 1848 that Gützlaff had turned his back on being a missionary and become a corpulent figure enjoying a large civil service salary.

Gützlaff's second wife, Mary, died in 1849 in Singapore, and was buried there.

Unfortunately, Gützlaff's ideas outran his administrative ability.  He wound up being victimized by his own native missionaries.  They reported back to him glowing accounts of conversions and New Testaments sold.  While some of Gützlaff's native missionaries were genuine converts, others were opium addicts who never traveled to the places they claimed. Eager for easy money, they simply made up conversion reports and took the New Testaments which Gützlaff provided and sold them back to the printer who resold them to Gützlaff.  The scandal erupted while Gützlaff was in Europe on a fundraising tour.  Gützlaff married a third time, to Dorothy Gabriel, while in England in 1850.

Shattered by the exposure of the fraud, Gützlaff died in Hong Kong in 1851, leaving a £30,000 fortune.  He was buried in Hong Kong Cemetery.

Legacy

The Chinese Evangelization Society which he formed lived on to send out Hudson Taylor who founded the successful China Inland Mission.  Taylor called Gützlaff the grandfather of the China Inland Mission.

Society for the Diffusion of Useful Knowledge in China 
On 29November 1834, Gutzlaff  became a member of the newly formed "Society for the Diffusion of Useful Knowledge in China". The committee members represented a wide section of the business and missionary community in Canton: James Matheson (Chairman), David Olyphant, William Wetmore, James Innes, Thomas Fox, Elijah Coleman Bridgman, and John Robert Morrison. John Francis Davis, at that time chief superintendent of British trade in China, was made an honorary member.

Gutzlaff Street in Hong Kong was named after him.

Influences 
Gützlaff's writing influenced both David Livingstone and Karl Marx.  David Livingstone read Gützlaff's "Appeal to the Churches of Britain and America on Behalf of China" and decided to become a medical missionary. Unfortunately, it was 1840, and the outbreak of the First Opium War made China too dangerous for foreigners.  So the London Missionary Society sent him to Africa, where (in 1871) Henry Morton Stanley would find him working hard in Ujiji, Tanzania.

While Gützlaff was fundraising in Europe in 1850, Karl Marx went to hear him speak in London.  He also read Gützlaff's many writings, which became sources for Karl Marx' articles on China for the London Times and the New York Daily Tribune in the 1840s and 1850s, all of which are anti-imperialist and anti-religion.

Works 

 A Sketch of Chinese History, Ancient and Modern (London, 1834, German version in 1847), Volume One, Volume Two
  Volume One
 
 
 , under pseudonym "Philo-Sinensis"

Archives
Papers of and relating to Karl Gützlaff are held at the Cadbury Research Library, University of Birmingham.

Notes

References

Bibliography 
 Lutz, Jessie Gregory. Opening China: Karl F.A. Gützlaff and Sino-Western Relations, 1827–1852. Grand Rapids, Mich.: William B. Eerdmans Pub. Co., 2008. .
 Herman Schlyter, Der China-Missionar Karl Gützlaff und seine Heimatbasis: Studien über das Interesse des Abendlandes an der Mission des China-Pioniers Karl Gützlaff und über seinen Einsatz als Missionserwecker (Lund: LiberLäromedel/Gleerup, 1976) 
 Winfried Scharlau (ed.), Gützlaffs Bericht über drei Reisen in den Seeprovinzen Chinas 1831–1833 (Hamburg: Abera Verlag, 1997) 
 Thoralf Klein/Reinhard Zöllner (eds.), Karl Gützlaff (1803–1851) und das Christentum in Ostasien: Ein Missionar zwischen den Kulturen (Nettetal: Institut Monumenta Serica, Sankt Augustin/Steyler Verlag, 2005)

Further reading

External links 

 Scanned version of the <Journal of Three Voyages> at Singapore
 University of Hong Kong library page about book and Gützlaff
 "Gutzlaff, Karl Friedrich August,"  Biographical Dictionary of Chinese Christianity

1803 births
1851 deaths
People from Pyrzyce
Lutheran missionaries in China
German expatriates in China
Lutheran missionaries in Thailand
German Lutheran missionaries
German evangelicals
German lexicographers
People from the Province of Pomerania
Translators of the Bible into Chinese
Translators of the Bible into Thai
19th-century translators
19th-century German writers
19th-century German male writers
German expatriates in Thailand
German expatriates in Korea
Lutheran missionaries in Korea
German male non-fiction writers
19th-century Lutherans
Missionary linguists
19th-century lexicographers
German magazine founders